Oberholzeria etendekaensis, is a 2015 described, monotypic genus of flowering plants in the legume family, Fabaceae. It only contains one known species, Oberholzeria etendekaensis .

It is native to Namibia. It belongs to the subfamily Faboideae, though its tribal affiliation is unclear.

The genus and species were circumscribed by Wessel Swanepoel, Margaretha Marianne le Roux, Martin F. Wojciechowski and Abraham Erasmus Van Wyk in PLoS ONE 10(3): e122080 (11+12) in 2015.

The genus name of Oberholzeria is in honour of Johanna Allettha Oberholzer (b.1965), she is the wife of South African botanist and genus author Wessel Swanepoel.

References

Dalbergieae
Monotypic Fabaceae genera
Flora of Namibia